Procometis terrena is a moth of the family Autostichidae. It is endemic to Malawi and Zambia.

The wingspan is about 37 mm. The forewings are rather dark ashy-fuscous, lighter posteriorly. There is a broad ochreous-brown median stripe from the base, becoming suffused and obsolete beyond the middle, edged above by groups of scattered black scales beyond one-fourth and about the middle, and followed by two minute black dots transversely placed at two-thirds. The hindwings are light fuscous.

References

Procometis
Taxa named by Edward Meyrick
Moths described in 1908